"Cover You in Oil" is a song by the Australian hard rock band AC/DC. It was released as the third single from their 1995 album Ballbreaker. The B-sides of the single were fellow album tracks "Love Bomb" and "Ballbreaker".

Personnel
Brian Johnson – vocals
Angus Young – lead guitar
Malcolm Young – rhythm guitar, backing vocals
Cliff Williams – bass guitar, backing vocals
Phil Rudd – drums

Charts

References

External links
Lyrics at Rock Magic

AC/DC songs
1995 singles
Songs written by Angus Young
Songs written by Malcolm Young
Song recordings produced by Rick Rubin
1995 songs
Elektra Records singles